Mustapha El Khalfi ( - born 1973, Kenitra) is a Moroccan politician of the Justice and Development Party. Since 3 January 2012, he holds the position of Minister of Communications and Spokesperson of the Government in Abdelilah Benkirane's government. Before this he was editor-in-chief of the Attajdid newspaper.

Mustapha El Khalfi prohibited the distribution and screening of the film Exodus: Gods and Kings in 2014, as well as Nabil Ayouch's Much Loved a year later.

See also
Cabinet of Morocco

References

External links
Ministry of Communications

Living people
1973 births
Ministers of Communications of Morocco
Moroccan male journalists
Justice and Development Party (Morocco) politicians
People from Kenitra